Brazilian Grand Prix can refer to:

Brazilian Grand Prix, a Formula One motor race
Brazilian motorcycle Grand Prix
Grande Premio Brasil, a horse race